2001 Spanish regional elections may refer to:

2001 Basque regional election
2001 Galician regional election